Rafael Suvanto (June 28, 1909 in Turku – March 9, 1940 in Kärstilänjärvi) was a Finnish astronomer.

Suvanto was the assistant of Yrjö Väisälä. He died in the Winter War. His rank was lieutenant.

The Minor Planet Center credits him with the discovery of the asteroid 1927 Suvanto, dedicated to him posthumously, carried out on March 18, 1936.

References

Discoverers of minor planets
1909 births
1940 deaths
Finnish astronomers
Finnish military personnel killed in World War II